Coleophora ericoides is a moth of the family Coleophoridae. It is found in North America, including Ohio and Nova Scotia.

The larvae feed on the seeds of Symphyotrichum ericoides. They create a trivalved, tubular silken case.

References

ericoides
Moths described in 1919
Moths of North America